This list of mines in Australia is subsidiary to the list of mines article and lists working, defunct and planned mines in the country organised by primary mineral output. For practical purposes, this list also contains stone, marble and other quarries.

As of October 2012, there were 405 operating mines in Australia.

Coal

Anvil Hill 
Ebenezer Colliery
Ensham coal mine
Foxleigh coal mine
German Creek coal mine

Gregory coal mine
Daunia mine
Glendell coal mine
Goonyella Riverside Mine
Hail Creek coal mine
Integra Underground
Jeebropilly Mine
Jellinbah East coal mine
Kestrel coal mine
Lake Vermont Mine

List of collieries in Newcastle (Australia)
Lochend Colliery
Loy Yang Open-cut Coal Mine

Maules Creek Coal Mine
Middlemount coal mine
Millennium coal mine
Moonee Colliery
Moranbah North coal mine
Myuna Colliery
New Acland Mine
New Oakleigh Mine
Newlands coal mine
North Goonyella coal mine
Norwich Park coal mine
Oaky Creek coal mine
Peak Downs Mine
Rolleston coal mine
Saraji coal mine

South Walker Creek coal mine
South Waratah Colliery
Stanford Main No. 2 Colliery
Tahmoor Colliery
Telford Cut
Teralba Colliery

Wallarah 2 Coal Project
Wallarah Colliery

Yarrabee coal mine
Westside Mine

Cobalt
Browns polymetallic ore deposit
Murrin Murrin Joint Venture
Ravensthorpe Nickel Mine
Pulam Gold Mine in Laiagam

Copper

Browns polymetallic ore deposit
Cadia-Ridgeway Mine
Carrapateena mine
Copper Mines of Tasmania
Ernest Henry mine
Golden Grove Mine
Hillside mine (proposed)
Kanmantoo mine
Mount Dundas (Tasmania)
Mount Elliott mine
Mount Isa Mines
Mount Jukes Mine sites
Mount Morgan Mine
Mount Read (Tasmania)
Olympic Dam mine
Prominent Hill Mine
Telfer Mine
Wheal Hughes

Lead

Gold
Broken Hill mine
Browns polymetallic ore deposit
Cannington Mine
Emily Ann and Maggie Hays nickel mines
Golden Grove Mine
Hilton Mine
McArthur River zinc mine
Mount Isa Mines
Stawell Gold Mine
Wheal Watkins

Diamond
Argyle diamond mine
Beta Hunt Mine
Browns polymetallic ore deposit
Emily Ann and Maggie Hays nickel mines
Honeymoon Well mine
Merlin diamond mind
Mount Keith Mine
Murrin Murrin Joint Venture
Ravensthorpe Nickel Mine

Lithium
Finniss Lithium Project

Nickel

Beta Hunt Mine
Bulong Nickel Mine
Cawse mine
Kambalda Nickel Operations
Leinster Nickel Mine
Mount Keith Mine
Murrin Murrin Mine
Ravensthorpe Nickel Mine

Silver
Broken Hill ore deposit
Cannington Mine
Golden Grove Mine
Hilton Mine
McArthur River zinc mine
Mount Isa Mines
Mount Morgan Mine
Navidad mine
Olympic Dam, South Australia
Prominent Hill Mine
Sunny Corner, New South wales
Wheal Watkins

Slate
Mintaro Slate Quarries Pty Ltd

Talc
Three Springs Mine

Tin
Emmaville, New South Wales
Mount Bischoff
Renison Bell, a

Tungsten
Dolphin mine
Mt Lindsay mine
Watershed mine

Uranium

Beverley Uranium Mine
Browns polymetallic ore deposit
El Sherana
Four Mile uranium mine
Honeymoon Uranium Mine
Jabiluka
Mary Kathleen, Queensland
Mount Fitch (Northern Territory)
Nabarlek Uranium Mine
Olympic Dam, South Australia
Radium Hill
Ranger Uranium Mine
Rum Jungle, Northern Territory

Zinc
Broken Hill ore deposit
Century Mine
George Fisher mine
Golden Grove Mine
Hilton Mine
McArthur River zinc mine
Mount Isa Mines
Cannington Mine
Dugald River Mine

Alumina/ Bauxite
Alcoa Australia
Rio Tinto Alcan
Weipa Mine
Worsley Alumina

See also
 Mining in Australia
 Australian mining law

Mining in Australia by State /Territory

Victoria
 Douglas Mine
 Stawell Gold Mine

Western Australia
 Mining in Western Australia
 Gold mining in Western Australia
 Western Australian gold rush
 List of active gold mines in Western Australia

See also 
 Mining in Australia

References